Congorilla (1932) is a documentary film by Martin and Osa Johnson. The film follows the couple through Africa as they encounter animals that they characterize as threatening before a lengthy sequence with the couple with a pygmy community.

It is considered one of the earliest ethnographic films.

References

External links

1932 documentary films
1932 films
American documentary films
Documentary films about Africa
American black-and-white films
1930s American films